The Columbus Division of Police (CPD) is the main policing unit for the city of Columbus, Ohio, in the United States. It is the largest police department in the state of Ohio, and among the twenty-five largest in the United States. It is composed of twenty precincts and numerous other investigative and support units.  Chief Elaine Bryant assumed leadership of the Division in 2021. Special units of the Columbus Division of Police include a Helicopter Unit, Canine Unit, Mounted Unit, Community Response Teams, Marine Park Unit, and Special Weapons and Tactics Team (SWAT).

As of June 2020, the Division was staffed with roughly 1,885 sworn police officers and 325+ civilian staff. In comparison, in 2016, the staffing was reported as 1,848 sworn officers and 416 civilian staff. The estimated total budget in 2016 was $310,139,284.

History
The department was founded in 1816, when town marshals patrolled the city streets. In 1860, the marshals began operating out of the Central Market, sharing offices with city officials. In April 1873, the city organized the Metropolitan Police. Its first captain, Alexis Keeler, served for one year, and oversaw 19 night officers and six day officers. In 1879, the department opened its second headquarters, a station at the Columbus City Prison. The department and prisoners moved to the city workhouse in Franklinton in 1920. This building was severely damaged by a tornado in May 1929. Walls fell on 162 jail cells, killing two prisoners. In 1930, the department opened the Central Police Station, a new larger building, still extant. Finding the space too small by the 1990s, the department opened the current Columbus Division of Police Headquarters in 1991.

Misconduct
On 21 October 1999, the US Department of Justice filed a lawsuit against the city based on its findings that "CPD officers are engaged in a pattern or practice of using excessive force, making false arrests and lodging false charges, and conducting improper searches and seizures in violation of the Fourth and Fourteenth Amendments to the Constitution." A year later, the DOJ also found that the department engaged in racial profiling. An effort to have the Division sign a Consent Decree failed, in part because the CPD union blocked it. In 2002, a federal judge dismissed the lawsuit after the city made changes on the use of force and the handling of complaints against officers.

The Public Safety Director sometimes rehires police officers it has fired for misconduct. In 2016, Officer Eric Moore was fired for overtime fraud. He was later rehired. In that same year Office Chad Knode was fired for profiting off the sale of city-owned property.  An investigation was centered on the misappropriation of items transferred to the Division from the US Department of Defense. He was rehired but his partner in the episode, Officer Steven Dean, was eventually jailed on unrelated charges.  In 2017, Officer Zachary Rosen was fired for kicking a handcuffed man in the head. He was rehired after an Arbitrator ruled his firing was not inline with past practice.

In June 2018, officers of the Division's Vice Unit improperly arrested Adult Performer Stormy Daniels at a strip club. The prosecution was declined by the Columbus City Attorney Office. Stormy Daniels has claimed that she had a liaison with Donald Trump before he was elected U.S. president. Later in the year a supervisor who had been recommended for firing by the Chief of Police due to discrimination charges was reinstated by the Safety Director.

In March 2019. Officer Andrew Mitchell, a thirty-one-year veteran of the force, was charged by the United States District Attorney with kidnapping under the color of authority (law). He is accused of raping women that he had arrested in exchange for their freedom. The Franklin County Prosecutor's Office later acquired state level indictments against Officer Mitchell that involved a shooting and death of a female. The ten-officer, three-supervisor VICE unit that he was a member has since been disbanded. The abolishment of this unit came after a month's long 'stand down' and unit review. The action to disband the unit had been anticipated for some time.

The Columbus Division of Police has been criticized for its aggressive handling of the George Floyd protests happening in Columbus. On May 31, seven cases of excessive police force during the protests were reported by the local news site Columbus Navigator. They include instances of police using pepper spray on protesters walking away or leaving protests and removing a protester's mask in order to spray them. On the following day, Mayor Andrew Ginther and Columbus City Council denounced the police chief and his officers for their aggressive tactics. Ginther created an independent review board for police actions: he asks protesters to report instances of excessive force by police during the protests, to be reviewed by a civilian from the Department of Public Safety's Equal Employment Opportunity Compliance Office. In 2021, a federal judge imposed an injunction on the CPD's use of tear gas and rubber bullets on protestors. The judge found that the department had used violence "random and indiscriminately" against peaceful protestors.

In December 2020, an unarmed man, Andre Hill was killed by Officer Adam Coy. The officer, a seventeen-year veteran of the department was arrested and charged with murder, felonious assault and dereliction of duty. Police officers at the scene had not turned their body cameras on and did not give first aid to the dying man.

On August 30 2022, officer Ricky Anderson shot and killed Donovan Lewis while serving a warrant in the early hours of the morning. Lewis was unarmed. In response, Chief Elaine Bryant barred officers from executing arrest warrants at private homes for minor offenses between the hours of 11 pm and 6 am, unless approved by a lieutenant or higher officer.

Funding and overruns
The City of Columbus plans to spend $359 million on the department in 2020, including $332 million in personnel costs. This is contrasted by Cleveland at $218 million and Cincinnati at $151 million. The city has spent about $300 million each year on the department. 2019 costs include $345 million for police, $266 million for fire, $40 million in development (planning, housing, administration, etc.) $24 million for the health department, $5 million for the neighborhoods department, $40 million for recreation and parks, $31 million for trash collection, and about $31 million on its municipal court.

The department was criticized in 2010 for funding its officers to become taxpayer-funded millionaires. Upper-management officers, through the Deferred Retirement Option Plan (DROP), can retire at age 48 and receive 60-72 percent of their salary as a pension, and still have the option of working and earning a salary. The program allows these officers to receive lump sums of $1 million, with annual raises of 3 percent. Individual officers living to age 78 are eligible to collect $3.25 million from taxpayers through the program, with only $74,000 contributed from the officer. The DROP program is kept largely secret, with no official estimate of the overall expense.

The Deferred Retirement Option Plan (DROP) was first requested by the Ohio Chief of Police and Ohio Fire Chiefs as a means to retain trained and seasoned employees. This optional benefit allows members who are eligible to retire to stay on duty serving their communities for up to eight years. Although different opinions exist concerning the DROP program it has allowed for retention of firefighters and police officers that would have otherwise not been replaced due to budgetary concerns.  The program is administered by the Police & Fire Retirement Fund (OP&F). This fund was created in 1965 in an effort to consolidate 454 local public safety pension funds across Ohio. Currently OP&F serves approximately 27,000 active members and more than 30,000 retirees and their beneficiaries. The fund receives monies from active member and their employers and distributes benefits to retirees and other beneficiaries and directed by the board of directors.

The department operates six aircraft, including five helicopters. The fleet costs taxpayers $6.55 million a year. The cost of the fleet equals the base salaries for 70 police officers at the top of the nine-year union step schedule of $92,934 a year. Along with the commander of the helicopter unit, there are 20 pilots. In 2021, the unit stirred controversy when one of its helicopters spelled CPD in flight, as viewed in a flight-tracker.

Training
The division's police academy is the James G. Jackson Police Training Academy. The program involves 31 weeks of training at the academy, followed by 15 weeks of field training. Some recruits at the academy train to join the Columbus police, but the academy also serves other police departments in central Ohio. Standards and testing for police are set by the statewide Ohio Peace Officer Training Academy.

Structure

The Columbus Division of Police has a total of six subdivisions. The subdivisions include Patrol Operations, Public Accountability, Criminal Investigations, Support Services, Community Services and Special Operations. Each subdivision is commanded by a deputy chief. As the Division has grown in size the number of subdivisions has increased. , the Division had 460 marked patrol vehicles, 410 unmarked vehicles, 31 motorcycles, 154 bicycles, five boats, ten horses, twelve police dogs, and five helicopters.

Rank structure
Current rankings are as follows: (generally as of 2021)

Community Services Subdivision
Community Services Subdivision [formerly Patrol Operations] is divided into two Subdivisions.  Deputy Chief Jennifer Knight supervises the Community Services North Subdivision while Deputy Chief Gregory Bodker supervises the Community Services South Subdivision. There are five Patrol Zones that cover all geography areas of the city.  These zones are further divided into twenty precincts. The two Community Services Subdivisions are the largest by staffing within the Division.  Uniformed Patrol Officers handle dispatched calls for service from residents and patrol the incorporated area.

Public Accountability Subdivision
The Public Accountability Subdivision includes the Fiscal Management Bureau, Human Resources Bureau, Professional Standards Bureau, and Internal Affairs Bureau. Background Investigations for police recruits falls within this subdivision as well.

Criminal Investigations Subdivision
The Criminal Investigations Subdivision's Deputy Chief is Timothy Becker. The Criminal Investigations Subdivision includes Major Crimes Bureau, Drug Crimes Bureau, and Special Victims Bureau.  Homicide, Robbery, Gun Crimes, Drug Task Forces, Sexual Assault and Missing Persons are only some of the investigative units assigned under this subdivision.

Support Services Subdivision
The Support Services Subdivision includes the following bureaus: Forensics, Records Management, Support Operations and Wellness. The Crime Lab, Records, Identification, Evidence Room, Impound Lot and Court Liaison units report to this deputy chief.

Community Services Subdivision
The Community Services Subdivision houses the Community Response Bureau, Property Crimes Bureau and the Training Bureau.  The Recruiting Unit, Community Liaison, General Detectives and the Academy Training staff all work under this subdivision.

Special Operations Subdivision
This Subdivision's Deputy Chief is Kenneth Kuebler. The Special Operations Subdivision includes the Communications Bureau, Special Services Bureau, and Traffic Bureau. The 911 Call Center, SWAT, Homeland Security and Special Events are managed in this subdivision The City of Columbus announced that in 2021 the Communications Bureau would be transferred to the Public Safety Department.  It will be led by a civilian supervisor and will provided services to the Fire and Police Divisions.

Chiefs of Police
The department's current chief of police is Elaine Bryant. Previous chiefs include Thomas Quinlan - appointed 2019, Kimberley Jacobs - appointed 2012, Interim Chief Gammill - appointed 2012, Distelzweig - appointed 2009, James G. Jackson - appointed 1990, D. Joseph - appointed 1983, Burden - appointed 1972, and W. Joseph appointed 1970.

Labor representation

Police officers employed by the city are represented by their local union, Fraternal Order of Police Capital City Lodge No. 9. The union represents policemen in 28 departments in the central Ohio region. Public workers gained the right to organize in 1984.

See also

 Government of Columbus, Ohio
 Killing of Andre Hill
 Killing of Ma'Khia Bryant
 List of law enforcement agencies in Ohio

References

External links

 

Organizations based in Columbus, Ohio
Municipal police departments of Ohio
Government of Columbus, Ohio